Valentin Vdovichenko (28 October 1928 – 31 December 2003) was a Soviet Olympic fencer. He competed in the team épée event at the 1956 Summer Olympics.

References

External links
 

1928 births
2003 deaths
Soviet male fencers
Olympic fencers of the Soviet Union
Fencers at the 1956 Summer Olympics